Under the Basic Law, the Hong Kong Special Administrative Region is exclusively in charge of its internal affairs and external relations, whilst the central government of China is responsible for its foreign affairs and defence. As a separate customs territory, Hong Kong maintains and develops relations with foreign states and regions, and plays an active role in such international organisations as World Trade Organization (WTO) and the Asia-Pacific Economic Cooperation (APEC) in its own right under the name of Hong Kong, China. Hong Kong participates in 16 projects of United Nations Sustainable Development Goals.

Overview
Hong Kong makes strenuous law enforcement efforts, but faces serious challenges in controlling transit of heroin and methamphetamine to regional and world markets; modern banking systems that provide a conduit for money laundering; rising indigenous use of synthetic drugs, especially among young people.

Hong Kong has its own immigration policy and administration. Permanent residents of Hong Kong with PRC nationality hold a different type of passport, called the Hong Kong Special Administrative Region Passport, which is different from that for PRC citizens in Mainland China. Hong Kong permanent residents and mainland Chinese need a passport-like document (the "Home Return Permit" for Hong Kong permanent residents and the Two-way Permit for Mainland Chinese) to cross the Sino-Hong Kong border. Visitors from other countries and regions not participating in waiver programme are required to apply for visas directly to the Hong Kong Immigration Department.

According to the official data provided by the Hong Kong Immigration Department in January 2020, There are 168 countries and regions that implement visa-free policies for residents holding Hong Kong passports.

Hong Kong Office

Hong Kong was under British rule before 1 July 1997. Prior to the implementation of the Hong Kong Economic and Trade Office Act 1996 enacted by the British Parliament, Hong Kong represented its interests abroad through the Hong Kong Economic and Trade Offices (HKETOs) and via a special office in the British Embassies or High Commissions, but the latter ceased after the sovereignty of Hong Kong was transferred to the PRC and became a special administrative region (SAR) of the PRC in 1997. At present, the Hong Kong Economic and Trade Offices under the Government of the Hong Kong Special Administrative Region in countries that are the major trading partners of Hong Kong, including Japan, Canada, Australia, Singapore, Indonesia, the United Kingdom, Germany, the United States, the European Union as well as an ETO in Geneva to represent HKSAR Government in the WTO. These offices serve as the official representative of the Government of the Hong Kong SAR in these countries and international organisations. Its major functions include facilitating trade negotiations and handling trade related matters, inter-government relations with foreign governments; the promoting of investment in Hong Kong; and liaising with the media and business community.  The Hong Kong Government has also set up the Hong Kong Tourism Board with offices in other countries and regions to promote tourism.

International agreements

In accordance with Article 151 of the Basic Law, Hong Kong concluded over 20 agreements with foreign states in 2010 on matters such as economic and financial co-operation, maritime technical co-operation, postal co-operation and co-operation on wine-related businesses. Under the Basic Law, the Hong Kong also concluded 12 bilateral agreements with foreign states on air services, investment promotion and protection, mutual legal assistance and visa abolition during the year.

Free trade agreement

Officially signed 

 Mainland China (CEPA) (June 2003)
 New Zealand (March 2010)
 Chile (September 2012)
 Iceland (October 2012)
 Liechtenstein (October 2012)
 Switzerland (October 2012)
 Norway (November 2012)
 Macao (October 2017)
 Georgia (June 2018)
 Australia (March 2019)
 ASEAN：Ten ASEAN countries (June 2019)
 Maldives (negotiations completed)

Negotiating 
Pacific Alliance
RCEP
United Kingdom

From the Chief Executive's Policy Address in October 2018.

International organizations 

Note

 Hong Kong participates in 41 intergovernmental international organizations with countries as participating units.
 Hong Kong participates in 54 intergovernmental international organizations that do not use countries as their participating units.

APEC
G20
Asian Development Bank
The World Bank Group
Bank for International Settlements
Economic and Social Commission for Asia and the Pacific (Associate)
Financial Action Task Force on Money Laundering
International Chamber of Commerce
International Confederation of Free Trade Unions
International Hydrographic Organization
International Maritime Organization (Associate)
International Monetary Fund
International Olympic Committee (through Hong Kong Olympic Committee)
International Organization for Standardization (Correspondent)
Interpol (Sub-Bureau)
Universal Postal Union
Venerable Order of Saint John (Associated Body)
World Confederation of Labour
World Customs Organization
World Meteorological Organization
World Tourism Organization (Associate)
World Trade Organization

Overseas visits made by senior officials

The Chief Executive of Hong Kong & other senior officials often make a duty visit to foreign countries. These visits usually aim to advance Hong Kong's economic and trade relations with the foreign countries. During these visits, the Chief Executive will meet with political and business leaders. Usually, the head of state or head of government of the foreign countries will receive the Chief Executive. For example, former Chief Executive Tung Chee-hwa made three visits to the United States during his term. In these three visits, Tung Chee-hwa met with the U.S. President in the Oval Office at the White House. Chief Executive Donald Tsang had visited Japan, South Korea, Russia, United Kingdom, United States, Australia, New Zealand, Chile, Brazil, India, France and other countries during his term of government.

For example, the then Chief Executive Donald Tsang visited London and Edinburgh in 2011 as part of his European tour to renew ties with the UK and promote Hong Kong as a gateway to Asia. He met Prime Minister David Cameron and Foreign Secretary William Hague, and the Chancellor of the Exchequer George Osborne. In mid-2011, Donald Tsang visited Australia in June to strengthen ties between Hong Kong and Australia, promote trade opportunities, and encourage more Australian companies, particularly resources companies, to list in Hong Kong. During his visit, Mr Tsang held meetings with the Prime Minister, Julia Gillard, and the Minister for Foreign Affairs, Kevin Rudd, as well as the leader of the Opposition, Tony Abbott, and the Shadow Minister for Foreign Affairs, Julie Bishop.

Many foreign dignitaries visit Hong Kong each year. The number of such visits has grown since 1997 as many of them have included Hong Kong as a destination on their trips to China, while others have visited Hong Kong specifically to see "one country, two systems" in operation. The level of VIP visits is also boosted by major international conferences held in Hong Kong in recent years. In 2009–2012, there were 11 official visits to Hong Kong, including the visits of the Prime Minister of Canada, Secretary of State of the United States of America, President of the Russian Federation, President of the Republic of Indonesia, President of the Republic of Korea and other foreign dignitaries.

Foreign officials visit Hong Kong

Protocol Division Government Secretariat 

The Protocol Division Government Secretariat is responsible for liaising with the large consulate groups of various countries stationed in the Hong Kong and providing host government services to these consular groups.The Protocol Division Government Secretariat also represents Hong Kong government to receive national leaders and international organizations visiting Hong Kong, and plan and coordinate official visits to Hong Kong by members of the foreign royal family and senior government leaders.

Foreign officials 

As of November 2005, the Hong Kong Government has received more than 60 foreign heads of state, government and senior ministers for official visits to Hong Kong. Leaders who have visited Hong Kong include Canadian Prime Minister Justin Trudeau, Singaporean Prime Minister Lee Hsien Loong, Russian President, President of Panama, Prime Minister of New Zealand, Prime Minister of Pakistan, Prime Minister of the Netherlands, Dmitry Medvedev, and British Prime Minister Tony Blair.

Overseas representation in Hong Kong

When Hong Kong was under British rule, most Commonwealth member states, unlike other countries, were represented in Hong Kong by Commissions. However, following the 1997 handover, they were all renamed Consulates-General. Owing to Hong Kong's economic importance, and the large number of British passport holders, the British Consulate-General is the largest of its kind in the world and bigger than many British Embassies and High Commissions abroad.

Most countries maintain Consulates-General or Consulates in Hong Kong. However, despite their name, many Consulates-General are not subordinate to their country's embassy to the PRC in Beijing. For example, the British Consulate-General is directly subordinate to the Foreign and Commonwealth Office of the UK rather than the British embassy in the Chinese capital. The Consul-General of the United States, likewise, holds ambassadorial rank, and reports to the Assistant Secretary of State for East Asian Affairs in the US Department of State. By contrast, the US Consuls-General posted to Chengdu, Guangzhou, Shanghai, and Shenyang report to the Deputy Chief of Mission of the US Embassy in Beijing who is directly subordinate to the US ambassador.

See also 
 Foreign relations of China
 Foreign relations of Macau
 Hong Kong Economic and Trade Office
 Consular missions in Hong Kong
 Hong Kong–United Kingdom relations
 Hong Kong–United States relations
 Visa policy of Hong Kong

References

Citations

Sources 

 CIA – The World Factbook 2006

External links
 Ministry of Foreign Affairs of PRC
 Protocol Division of Hong Kong Government
 Office of the Commissioner of PRC's Ministry of Foreign Affairs in Hong Kong
 Office of the Commissioner of PRC's Ministry of Foreign Affairs in Macao

 
Hong Kong and the Commonwealth of Nations